Eugenia Kumacheva  is a University Professor and Distinguished Professor of Chemistry at the  University of Toronto. Her research interests span across the fields of fundamental and applied polymers science, nanotechnology, microfluidics, and interface chemistry. She was awarded the L'Oréal-UNESCO Awards for Women in Science in 2008 "for the design and development of new materials with many applications including targeted drug delivery for cancer treatments and materials for high density optical data storage". She is Canadian Research Chair in Advanced Polymer Materials (Tier 1). She is Fellow of the Royal Society (FRS) and a Fellow of the Royal Society of Canada (FRSC).

Education and early life 
Eugenia Kumacheva was born in Odessa, Soviet Union. After earning her undergraduate degree (cum laude) from the Technical University in St. Petersburg, she worked in industry for several years before beginning her Ph.D. research. In 1986, she was awarded her  Ph.D. degree in physical chemistry of polymers in the Institute of Physical Chemistry Russian Academy of Sciences.

Career and research
Eugenia then worked as a staff scientist at the Moscow State University before beginning her postdoctoral fellowship supported by Minerva Foundation with Professor Jacob Klein at the Weizmann Institute of Science in Israel. She then joined the research lab of Professor Mitch Winnik at the University of Toronto in Canada to study multicomponent polymer systems. In 1996, Kumacheva became an Assistant Professor in the Department of Chemistry at the University of Toronto, and in 2005, she was promoted to the ranks of Full Professor. Eugenia has published 2 books, 10 book chapters, and 295 papers with >70 citations/paper. She holds 40 patents and is a founder of two companies FlowJEM and KuBE Materials Solutions. She has given >300 invited, keynote and plenary lectures, as well as public lectures.  In 2008, she was the first Canadian recipient of the L'Oréal-UNESCO "Women in Science" Prize. In 2016, she was elected a Fellow of the Royal Society. In 2017, she was awarded a CIC medal "presented as a mark of distinction and recognition to a person who has made an outstanding contribution to the science of chemistry or chemical engineering in Canada, this is the CIC’s top award."  In 2020, Eugenia was appointed by The Governor General of Canada as an Officer to the Order of Canada for “her contributions to chemistry, notably through microfluidics and polymer research, and for her efforts as an advocate for women in science".

Eugenia Kumacheva's work focuses on polymer science, nanoscience, microfluidics, and interface chemistry. She is strongly interested in research with biological applications. Recently, she became involved in the use artificial intelligence (machine learning) for materials syntehsis and fabrication. Eugenia Kumacheva has been involved in modeling the biological conditions of myocardial infarctions, strokes, pulmonary embolism, and various other blood related disorders or health conditions using polymers and nanomaterials. She explored the potential of microbubbles, a gas enclosed by a natural or synthetic polymer for both diagnostic and therapeutic applications such as targeted drug delivery and molecular imaging. An additional medical application of Kumacheva's work is the creation of hydrogels and various other chemical environments to either support the life of a stem cell, affect necrotic heart tissue as well as deter the metastasis of cancer cells. Kumacheva has made strong contributions in the area of self-assembly of nanoparticles and microparticles. Her research interests include  nature-derived nanopartocles, e.g., cellulose nanocrystals and nanofibers ).

Honors and awards 
Eugenia Kumacheva's awards and honors include:
 1992: Minerva Foundation Fellowship (Germany)
 1994:  Imperial College London Visiting Fellowship (UK)
 1999: Premier Research Excellence Award (Canada)
 2000: International Chorafas Foundation Award
 2002: Recipient of Canada Research Chair in Advanced Polymer Materials/Tier 2
 2003: Schlumberger Scholarship University of Oxford
 2004: Clara Benson Award (CIC Award)
 2005: Macromolecular Science and Engineer Award, Chemical Institute of Canada
 2006: Recipient of Canada Research Chair in Advanced Polymer Materials/ Tier 1
 2007: Elected a Fellow of the Royal Society of Canada (FRSC) 
 2017: E. Gordon Young Lectureship, The Chemical Institute of Canada 
 2008: L'Oréal-UNESCO Women in Science Prize (Laureate for North America) 
 2009: Japan-Canada WISET lectureship, Royal Society of Canada
 2010: Killam Research Fellowship, Canada Council for the Arts
 2011: Distinguished Lecturer, The University of Western Ontario, Canada. 
 2011: Connaught Innovation Award, Connaught Foundation.
 2012: Humboldt Research Award, Alexander von Humboldt Foundation (Germany). 
 2012: Inventor of the Year, University of Toronto
 2013: University Professor (distinction given to <2% of faculty at the University of Toronto
 2016: Elected a Fellow of the Royal Society (FRS) the British National Academy of Science
 2017:  Schmidt Lectureship, Weizmann Institute of Science, Israel
 2017: Chemical Institute of Canada Medal
 2019: 3M Lectureship
 2019: De Gennes Prize, Royal Society of Chemistry
 2020: Honorary Award for Lifetime Achievement in Nanoscience and Nanotechnology in Ontario
 2020: Elected as an Officer of the Order of Canada
 2021: Recipient of the Guggenheim Fellowship

References 

Scientists from Odesa
Living people
21st-century Canadian women scientists
Canadian women academics
Canadian women chemists
Scientists from Toronto
L'Oréal-UNESCO Awards for Women in Science laureates
21st-century British women scientists
Canadian Fellows of the Royal Society
Female Fellows of the Royal Society
Year of birth missing (living people)
Saint Petersburg State Institute of Technology alumni
Academic staff of the University of Toronto
Academic staff of Moscow State University
Russian women chemists
Ukrainian emigrants to Canada
Officers of the Order of Canada
21st-century Canadian chemists